This Is the Sound is the first studio album by the Swiss progressive metal band Cellar Darling. It was released on 30 June 2017 by Nuclear Blast.

Reception
This Is the Sound received positive reviews by critics upon release.

Writing for Heavy, Dave Griffiths wrote, "This Is The Sound is a modern day work of art. The three talented musicians behind Cellar Darling have just raised the bar in the Celtic/Folk Metal world to a whole new level." Charlotte Ekin from Distorted Sound magazine also gave a positive review writing, "This Is The Sound is a great example of what can be made when certain elements from genres collide and risks are taken."

Track listing
All lyrics written by Anna Murphy. All music by Anna Murphy, Ivo Henzi & Merlin Sutter.

Personnel

Musicians
 Anna Murphy – vocals, hurdy-gurdy, flute, keyboards
 Ivo Henzi – guitars, bass guitar
 Merlin Sutter – drums

Chart performance

References

2017 albums
Cellar Darling albums
Nuclear Blast albums